Selangor F.C. II plays the 2021 season in the Malaysia Premier League.

Review and events
During pre-season, five players from 2020 season have been promoted to first team.

On 19 January 2021, George Attram and Jordan Ayimbila joined the club on loan from Accra Lions.

On 19 March 2021, Selangor II won 1-0 over Kelantan United in league match.

On 25 April 2021, the club draw 2-2 against Terengganu II in a league match.

On 12 June 2021, Alex Agyarkwa joined the club on loan from Accra Lions.

On 10 August 2021, the club draw 1-1 during league match against Sarawak United.

Shivan Pillay has been appointed as club's captain.

Competitions

Malaysia Premier League

League table

Fixtures and results

Coaching staff
 Head coach: Michael Feichtenbeiner
 Assistant head coach: Rusdi Suparman
 Assistant coach: Mohamed Aslam Haja Najumudeen
 Goalkeeper coach: Shuhaimi Abdul Hamid
 Fitness coach: Mashidee Sulaiman

Statistics

Appearances and goals

|-
! colspan=18 style=background:#dcdcdc; text-align:center| Goalkeepers 

|-
! colspan=18 style=background:#dcdcdc; text-align:center| Defenders 

 

                                                     
|-
! colspan=18 style=background:#dcdcdc; text-align:center| Midfielders  

|-
! colspan=18 style=background:#dcdcdc; text-align:center| Forwards 

|-
! colspan=18 style=background:#dcdcdc; text-align:center| Players transferred out during the season 
|-

References

2021
Selangor II